The 1886–87 season was the 14th season of competitive football in Scotland. This season saw the inaugural playing of the Scottish Junior Cup.

Honours

Cup honours

National

County

Teams in F.A. Cup

Scotland national team

Notes

References

External links
Scottish Football Historical Archive
Scottish Junior Football Association

 
Seasons in Scottish football